Highlands County is a county located in the Florida Heartland region of the U.S. state of Florida. As of the 2020 census, the population was 101,235. Its county seat is Sebring.

Highlands County comprises the Sebring-Avon Park, FL Metropolitan Statistical Area.

History
Highlands County was created in 1921 along with Charlotte, Glades, and Hardee, when they were separated from DeSoto County.  It was named for the terrain of the county. It boasted the fifth-oldest population in America in 2012.

Geography
In area, it is the 14th largest county in Florida. Highlands County is bounded on the east by the Kissimmee River. Lake Istokpoga, the largest lake in the county, is connected to the Kissimmee River by two canals; the Istokpoga canal, and the C41 (outflow) canal.

Adjacent counties
 Osceola County, Florida - northeast
 Okeechobee County, Florida - east
 Glades County, Florida - south
 Charlotte County, Florida - southwest
 DeSoto County, Florida - west
 Hardee County, Florida - west
 Polk County, Florida - north

National protected area
 Lake Wales Ridge National Wildlife Refuge (part)

Demographics

As of the 2020 United States census, there were 101,235 people, 42,721 households, and 27,169 families residing in the county.

As of 2015, there were 99,491 people and 39,931 households living in the county. The population density was 97.2 people per square mile. The racial makeup of the county was 85.8% White, 10.4% Black or African American, 0.7% Native American, 1.5% Asian, 0.1% Pacific Islander, and 1.6% from two or more races. 18.2% of the population were Hispanic or Latino of any race. 51.3% of the entire population are female. The median household income was $35,560 with 20.1% of the population being below the poverty level from 2009 to 2013. The poverty line for Florida was $11,490 in 2013.

As of the census of 2000, there were 87,366 people, 37,471 households, and 25,780 families living in the county. The population density was 85.00 people per square mile (32.82/km2). The racial makeup of the county was 83.47% White, 9.33% Black or African American, 0.44% Native American, 1.05% Asian, 0.03% Pacific Islander, 4.14% from other races, and 1.53% from two or more races.  12.07% of the population were Hispanic or Latino of any race.

In 2000 there were 37,471 households, out of which 20.00% had children under the age of 18 living with them, 57.20% were married couples living together, 8.50% had a female householder with no husband present, and 31.20% were non-families. 26.30% of all households were made up of individuals, and 16.70% had someone living alone who was 65 years of age or older.  The average household size was 2.30 and the average family size was 2.70.

In the county, the population was spread out, with 19.20% under the age of 18, 6.30% from 18 to 24, 19.30% from 25 to 44, 22.20% from 45 to 64, and 33.00% who were 65 years of age or older.  The median age was 50 years. For every 100 females, there were 95.20 males.  For every 100 females age 18 and over, there were 92.20 males.

The median income for a household in the county was $30,160, and the median income for a family was $35,647. Males had a median income of $26,811 versus $20,725 for females. The per capita income for the county was $17,222.  About 10.20% of families and 15.20% of the population were below the poverty line, including 25.60% of those under age 18 and 7.40% of those age 65 or over.

Transportation

Highways
 U.S. Route 27
 State Road 17
 U.S. Route 98
 State Road 64
 State Road 66
 State Road 70
 Sebring Parkway/Panther Parkway

Airports
 Sebring Regional Airport     (KSEF)
 Avon Park Executive Airport  (KAVO)

Rail
 CSX Transportation           (CSXT)
 Amtrak                       (AMTK)

Government
Highlands County is governed by five elected County Commissioners and an appointed County Administrator. The administrator has executive powers to implement all decisions, ordinances, motions, and policies/procedures set forth by the Board. The FY 2013-2014 adopted budget of the county is approximately $123 million and the county employees over 350 people in 31 departments of the administration. Other organizations of the county include, the Clerk of Courts with about 75 positions, Sheriff's Office with about 340 positions, County Appraisers Office with about 30 positions, Tax Collectors Office with about 40 positions, and Elections Office with 5 positions. In all there are about 860 positions in Highlands County government.

Law Enforcement
Highlands County Sheriffs Office is the primary law enforcement agency for the non incorporated areas of Highlands County, Paul Blackman is the Sheriff. The City of Sebring and Town of Lake Placid have their own respective police departments. Avon Park Police Department closed its doors in 2015, the Sheriffs Office is now the primary law enforcement agency for the town. All public safety in Highlands County utilize a Motorola P25 Trunked Radio System which was initiated by Polk County. Highlands and Hardee Counties have piggybacked onto the system. To date, Highlands County Law Enforcement is the only law enforcement on the entire system to use 24/7 ADP encryption.

Politics
Highlands County, like the relatively nearby southwest coast, is strongly Republican: the last Democrat to win a majority in the county was Harry Truman in 1948. Like North Florida, but unlike the southwest coast, George Wallace was able to outpoll the Democratic Party here in 1968, and only in 1992 and 1996 has the Republican candidate not won an absolute majority since.

Economy

Top employers
The top private employers of Highlands County are as follows:
1. Advent Health Hospital (1500)
2. Walmart (796)
3. Agero (600)
4. Highlands Regional Medical Center (413)
5. Delray Plants (350)
6. Palms of Sebring (257)
7. Alan Jay Automotive Network (250)
8. Lake Placid Health Care (210)
9. Positive Medical Transport (150)
10. E-Stone USA (87)

Libraries
Highlands County is part of the Heartland Library Cooperative which serve Highlands County and some of the surrounding counties in the Florida Heartland, including Glades, DeSoto, Hardee, and Okeechobee. Based in Sebring, the cooperative has seven branches within the Heartland region, with three of those branches in Highlands County: Avon Park, Lake Placid and Sebring.

Communities

Cities
 Avon Park
 Sebring

Town
 Lake Placid

Unincorporated communities

 Avon Park Lakes
 Brighton
 Cornwell
 DeSoto City
 Fort Basinger
 Fort Kissimmee
 Hicoria
 Lorida
 Placid Lakes
 Spring Lake
 Sun 'n Lake of Sebring
 Sylvan Shores
 Venus

See also
 Florida Heartland
 Lake Denton
 National Register of Historic Places listings in Highlands County, Florida
 Samaritan's Touch Care Center

References

External links

Government links/Constitutional offices
 Highlands County Board of County Commissioners official website
 Highlands County Supervisor of Elections
 Highlands County Property Appraiser
 Highlands County Tax Collector
 Florida DOT Highlands county General Highway Map

Special districts
 Highlands County Public Schools
 South Florida Water Management District
 Southwest Florida Water Management District
 Heartland Library Cooperative

Judicial branch
 Highlands County Clerk of Courts
  Public Defender, 10th Judicial Circuit of Florida serving Hardee, Highlands, and Polk counties
  Office of the State Attorney, 10th Judicial Circuit of Florida
  Circuit and County Court for the 10th Judicial Circuit of Florida

Tourism links
 Highlands County Convention and Visitors Bureau
 Highlands Hammock State Park

 
Florida counties
1921 establishments in Florida
Populated places established in 1921
Micropolitan areas of Florida